Michael Cochran is a former American football player and coach.  He served as the head football coach at MidAmerica Nazarene University in Olathe, Kansas from 2001 to 2005 and at Southern Nazarene University in Bethany, Oklahoma from 2006 to 2014, compiling a career college football record of 86–70.

Head coaching record

References

External links
 Southern Nazarene profile

Year of birth missing (living people)
Living people
Bethany Swedes football coaches
Bethany Swedes football players
MidAmerica Nazarene Pioneers football coaches
Southern Nazarene Crimson Storm football coaches
MidAmerica Nazarene University faculty